Swertia cordata is an important medicinal plant of the family Gentianaceae and is found distributed throughout temperate regions of the Himalaya. The species used in various ethnomedicinal systems and as an adulterant of Swertia chirayita.

References

cordata
Taxa named by Charles Baron Clarke